Pfannkuchen may refer to:
Berliner Pfannkuchen, sometimes called Krapfen, a filled pastry
Eierkuchen, which is a German pancake

See also
Pfannkuch, list of people with the surname